Purna Narayan Sinha was an Indian politician. He was elected to the Lok Sabha, the lower house of the Parliament of India, as a member of the Janata Party.

References

External links
Official biographical sketch in Parliament of India website

India MPs 1977–1979
Lok Sabha members from Assam
1916 births
Year of death missing
Janata Party politicians